A synapse is a neural junction used for communication between neurons

Synapse may also refer to:

Computing and information systems
 Apache Synapse, open source enterprise service bus (ESB) and mediation engine
 Azure Synapse, a fully managed cloud data warehouse
 Peltarion Synapse, a component-based integrated development environment for neural networks and adaptive systems
 Synapse (software), a free and open-source application launcher for Linux
 Synapse Audio Software, German software company that develops music production software for Mac OS and Microsoft Windows platforms
 Synapse.org, an open source scientific collaboration platform

Science
 Chemical synapse, in neurobiology
 Electrical synapse, in electrophysiology
 Immunological synapse, in immunology
 SyNAPSE (Systems of Neuromorphic Adaptive Plastic Scalable Electronics), a DARPA project
 Synapse, Fujifilm Medical Systems Picture archiving and communication system application

Publishing
 Synapse (journal), a neurology journal
 Synapse: The Magazine of the University of Nevada School of Medicine (online)
 Synapse Magazine, produced by the Chester County (PA) Hospital and Health System (online)
 Synapse (magazine), an electronic music magazine published 1976-1979
 Synapse Group, Inc., a multichannel marketing company and magazine distributor
 The Synapse, Oberlin College science magazine

Entertainment
 Synapse Films, a DVD releasing company specializing in cult and hard-to-find movies
 Synapse Software, an American computer game development and publishing company active during the early-1980s
 Celestial Synapse, musical event held at the Fillmore West on the evening of 19 February 1969
 Usurp Synapse, a screamo band from Indiana
 Synapse (film), a 2015 science fiction film
 Synapse, the fictional communications software in the 2001 film Antitrust (film)
 Synapse, song by British post-grunge band Bush on the album Razorblade Suitcase
 Synaps, series of Steinberger electric guitars

See also 
 Synapsid, a group of animals that includes mammals and everything more closely related to mammals than to other living amniotes
 Synapsis, the pairing of two homologous chromosomes that occurs during meiosis
 Synopsis, a brief summary of the major points of a written work